The saffron-crested tyrant-manakin (Neopelma chrysocephalum), or saffron-crested neopelma, is a species of bird in the family Pipridae, the manakins.

Description
It's a small short-tailed manakin, with a light yellowish breast; it has an overall appearance very similar to a flycatcher, and is named for the color of its saffron yellow crest.

Distribution and habitat
It is found in the Guianas, southern Venezuela and the northwestern Amazon Basin.  Its natural habitats are subtropical or tropical moist lowland forest and subtropical or tropical dry shrubland.

The range in northern South America is the coastal Guianan region extending into coastal northeastern Brazil, the extreme north of Amapá state. The range extends westward, and inland from Guyana into southeast Venezuela, eastern Colombia and then extends southeasterly down the Rio Negro river corridor to the Amazon River confluence and then the confluence of the Madeira River; it also extends upstream on the Amazon River 250 km to the Purus River confluence.

In the Amazon Basin, the North Region, Brazil, the species is in the states of Amapá, Amazonas, and very southern Roraima. Disjunct localized populations are in northern Peru along river headwaters, (the confluence region of the Ucayali River).

References

External links
Photo-High Res; Article--Highest Res https://www.nhlstenden.com/"Suriname Birds"

saffron-crested tyrant-manakin
Birds of Venezuela
Birds of the Guianas
Birds of the Amazon Basin
saffron-crested tyrant-manakin
Taxonomy articles created by Polbot